Jan Degenhardt (born 9 July 1962) is a German lawyer and folk-singer. His father is the political poetry and singer Franz Josef Degenhardt.

Life and career
Born in Saarbrücken, he studied jurisprudence in Hamburg from 1983 to 1990. After that he moved to Greifswald and worked as a docent at the Grone-school and the University of Greifswald until 1993. 1992 Degenhardt established as a lawyer in Greifswald.

In 1999, he published his first album with the title „Aufbruch". His same-named Song gets to the highscore list of the SFB in 2000. The same year he reached the second place at "Deutscher FolkFörderpreis".

After a promotion tour Jan Degenhardt published his second album called Stimmen hinter'm Spiegel in summer 2004.

In February 2011, his third album named Schamlos was chosen as CD of the month in June. The same month the song "Demokratie" reached the 8th place at the Liederbestenliste, even in July, it moved to second position.

Beside his father Franz Josef Degenhardt his brother Kai Degenhardt makes music, too.

Discography
 1999 Aufbruch
 2004 Stimmen hinter'm Spiegel
 2011 Schamlos

Honors and awards
 Deutscher FolkFörderpreis 2000
 Schamlos CD of the month at  June 2011

Notes

External links
 
 Jan Degenhardt on last.fm
 Interview on Folker!

German singer-songwriters
German folk singers
Academic staff of the University of Greifswald
German male singers
1962 births
Living people